Harold Percival "Whipper" Watson (May 6, 1923 – November 19, 2002) was a Canadian professional ice hockey left wing who played for the Brooklyn Americans, Detroit Red Wings, Toronto Maple Leafs, and Chicago Black Hawks, winning five Stanley Cups over a 14-year career in the National Hockey League.

Early life
Born in Saskatoon, Saskatchewan, Watson played junior hockey for the Saskatoon Junior Chiefs (1938–39), the Saskatoon Chiefs and Saskatoon Dodgers (1939–40), and the Saskatoon Junior Quakers (1940–41).

Career 
In 1941, at age 18, Watson turned professional with the Brooklyn Americans in the NHL in what would be the team's final season. He was selected by the Detroit Red Wings in an intraleague draft and played there in 1942–43, winning his first Stanley Cup. Watson then joined the Royal Canadian Air Force as World War II escalated. While in the military, he played for the Montreal RCAF team in 1943–44, as well as for the Saskatoon RCAF squad. The following season, he played for the Winnipeg RCAF team.

After a two-year break from the NHL, Watson rejoined the Red Wings after the war for one season and was traded to the Toronto Maple Leafs on September 21, 1946, for Billy Taylor. Watson played eight seasons for the Leafs, winning four Stanley Cups over that period. In 1948–49, he led the Leafs in points and goals, with 26 goals and 19 assists in 60 games. He didn't take a single penalty through the entire regular season.

Shortly into the 1954–55 season, the Leafs sold Watson to the Chicago Black Hawks. After three years in Chicago, Watson played one more year as a professional, as player-coach of the Buffalo Bisons in the American Hockey League, before retiring in 1958. He coached the St. Catharines Teepees of the Ontario Hockey League in 1958–59, and coached the senior Windsor Bulldogs to an Allan Cup championship in 1962–63.

Through his 14 years in the NHL, Watson played 809 games, scoring 236 goals and 207 assists for 443 points. He won five Stanley Cups (1943 with Detroit, and 1947, 1948, 1949, and 1951 with Toronto). He was inducted into the Hockey Hall of Fame in 1994.

Career statistics

* Stanley Cup Champion.

External links
 

1923 births
2002 deaths
Brooklyn Americans players
Buffalo Bisons (AHL) players
Canadian ice hockey left wingers
Royal Canadian Air Force personnel of World War II
Detroit Red Wings players
Hockey Hall of Fame inductees
Sportspeople from Saskatoon
St. Catharines Teepees players
Stanley Cup champions
Toronto Maple Leafs players
Ice hockey people from Saskatchewan
Canadian expatriate ice hockey players in the United States